Gaydamak is a surname. Notable people with the surname include:

 Alexandre Gaydamak (born 1976), Russian-French businessman
 Arcadi Gaydamak (born 1952), Russian-Israeli businessman and philanthropist, father of Alexandre

See also
 Haydamak, paramilitary bands in 18th-century Ukraine